High in the Saddle is the sixth studio album by American heavy metal band Texas Hippie Coalition. It was released on May 31, 2019, and is the band's first album released through Entertainment One Music. It is the only album with drummer Devon Carothers.

Background 
On March 29, 2019, the first single from the album, "Moonshine", was released.

Track listing 
Adapted from Infrared Magazine.

Personnel
Texas Hippie Coalition
 Big Dad Ritch – lead vocals
 Cord Pool – guitar
 Nevada Romo – guitar, backing vocals
 Larado Romo – bass (all except 4–6), backing vocals
 Devon Carothers – drums (all except 4–6)

Additional musicians
 Bob Marlette – bass (4–6), production
 Chris Marlette – drums (4–6)

References 

2019 albums
Texas Hippie Coalition albums
E1 Music albums
Albums produced by Bob Marlette